The Takada Dojo is a mixed martial arts academy in Tokyo, Japan.  The dojo takes its name from Nobuhiko Takada its founder.  Many members, including Takada, have participated in both professional wrestling and mixed martial arts.  The dojo and its founder were heavily involved in the formative events of the Pride Fighting Championships.

History
Takada would fully sponsor incoming hopefuls, giving them the opportunity to train every day in preparation for their first professional fight. Takada implemented a standard test for all of the incoming fighters at his dojo. Those who wished to become uchi-deshi or full-time students at his school, were required to undergo a sort of initiation ritual where a tireless routine of exercise stations and sparring partners were set up to test the will-power and heart of the new fighters.

Takada Dojo fighters

Current roster

Kensaku Nakamura
Masakazu Takafuji
Nobuhiko Takada
Ryuichi Murata
Wataru Takahashi
Yusuke Imamura

Former members

Daijiro Matsui
Kazuhiro Hamanaka
Kazushi Sakuraba
Kazuyuki Fujita
Masaaki Satake
Minoru Toyonaga
Motomare Takahashi
Paweł Nastula
Ricco Rodriguez
Shungo Oyama
Takenori Sato
Yoon Dong-Sik
Yoshihisa Yamamoto
Yōsuke Nishijima
Yuhi Sano
Yujiro Kushida

See also
List of Top Professional MMA Training Camps

References

External link
Takada Dojo on the GymDB

Dōjō
Mixed martial arts training facilities